Universal TV is a Turkish pay television network, owned by Universal Networks International, a division of NBCUniversal. The network was launched in Turkey in December 2009 on D-Smart and in February 2010 on Teledünya. From March 1, 2011, the Channel is also available in its HD version exclusively on D-Smart Platform.

Universal TV broadcasts TV series and movies produced by Universal Studios, Warner Bros. International Television, 20th Century Studios and Paramount Pictures. It has aired many series for first time on Turkish TV, such as Law & Order, Flashpoint and Trauma. Also part of the programming are non-scripted shows such as Flipping Out and Million Dollar Listing.
It aired series exclusively produced by Universal Studios for the first time in Turkey, such as Rookie Blue, Haven, Shattered, and Fairly Legal. The network also showed many Hollywood blockbusters of various genres not only from Universal Pictures but also from other major Hollywood studios such as Space Jam, Maverick, Wild Wild West and Mars Attacks!.

Programmes

Current Shows 
 30 Rock
 Covert Affairs
 Destination Truth
 Eureka
 Face Off
 Flashpoint
 Flipping Out
 Haunted Collector
 Haven
 House M.D.
 Jersey Couture
 Million Dollar Listing
 Law & Order
 Law & Order: Criminal Intent
 Law and Order: UK
 Parenthood
 Rocco's Dinner Party
 Psych
 Rookie Blue
 Royal Pains
 Sea Patrol
 Shattered
 Smash
 Suits
 The Office
 Top Design
 Up All Night
 100 Questions
 Against the Wall
 Any Human Heart
 Caprica
 Cold Squad
 Columbo
 Dance Your Ass Off
 Fairly Legal
 Hair Battle Spectacular
 Law & Order: Trial by Jury
 Law & Order: Los Angeles
 Mercy
 Monk
 Perfect Couples
 Running Russell Simmons
 Outlaw
 Outsourced
 The Cape
 The Event
 The Fashion Show
 Trauma
 Westworld

See also
Universal Channel

External links
Official Turkish Site

Television channels and stations established in 2009
Television channels and stations disestablished in 2013
Defunct television channels in Turkey
Turkish-language television stations
NBCUniversal networks